Red Star OS is a North Korean Linux distribution, with development first starting in 1998 at the Korea Computer Center (KCC). Prior to its release, computers in North Korea typically used Red Hat Linux and later switched to a modified Windows XP with North Korean language packs installed.

Version 3.0 was released in the summer of 2013, but , version 1.0 continues to be more widely used. It is offered only in a Korean language edition, localized with North Korean terminology and spelling.

Specifications
Red Star OS features a modified Mozilla Firefox browser called Naenara ("My country" in Korean), which is used for browsing the Naenara web portal on North Korea's national intranet known as Kwangmyong. Naenara comes with two search engines. Other software includes a text editor, an office suite, an e-mail client, audio and video players, a file sharing program, and video games. Version 3, like its predecessors, utilizes Wine, a compatibility layer that allows Windows programs to be run under Linux.

The operating system utilizes customized versions of KDE Software Compilation. Earlier versions had KDE 3-based desktops. Version 3.0 closely resembles Apple's macOS, whereas previous versions more closely resembled Windows XP; current North Korean leader Kim Jong-un was seen with an iMac on his desk in a 2013 photo, indicating a possible connection to the redesign.

Media attention

The Japan-based North Korea-affiliated newspaper Choson Sinbo interviewed two Red Star OS programmers in June 2006. English-language technology blogs, including Engadget and OSnews, as well as South Korean wire services such as Yonhap, went on to repost the content. In late 2013, Will Scott, who was visiting the Pyongyang University of Science and Technology, purchased a copy of version 3 from a KCC retailer in southern Pyongyang, and uploaded screenshots to the internet.

In 2015, two German researchers speaking at the Chaos Communication Congress described the internal operation of the OS. The North Korean government wants to track the underground market of USB flash drives used to exchange foreign films, music and writing, so the system watermarks all files on portable media attached to computers.

History

Version 1.0/Beta 

The first version appeared in 2008. It is very reminiscent of the Windows XP operating system.

It featured the "Naenara" web browser, based on Mozilla Firefox, and an Office suite based on Open Office, called "Uri 2.0". Wine is also included.

So far, no copies have been leaked online. The screenshots of the operating system were officially published by KCNA and discovered by South Korean news sites.

Version 2.0 
The development of version 2.0 began in March 2008, and was completed on June 3 2009. Like its predecessor, its appearance resembles Windows XP, and was priced at 2000 North Korean won (approx. US$15).

The "Naenara" internet browser is also included in this version. The browser was released on 6 August 2009, as part of the operating system, and was priced at 4000 North Korean won (approx. US$28).

The operating system uses a special keyboard layout that differs greatly from the South Korean standard layout.

Version 3.0 

Version 3.0 was introduced on April 15 2012, and its appearance resembles macOS operating systems of various versions. The new version supports both IPv4 and IPv6 addresses.

The operating system comes pre-installed with a number of applications that monitor its users. If a user tries to disable security functions, an error message will appear on the computer, or the operating system will crash and reboot. In addition, a watermarking tool integrated into the system marks all media content with the hard drive's serial number, allowing the North Korean authorities to trace the spread of files. The system also has hidden "anti-virus" software that is capable of removing censored files that are remotely stored by the North Korean secret service. There is a user group called "administrator" in the operating system. Users do not have root access by default, but are able to elevate their privileges to root by running a built-in utility called "rootsetting". However, provisions are made in kernel modules to deny even root users access to certain files, and extensive system integrity checks are done at boot time to ensure these files have not been modified.

Red Star OS 3 comes with a customized version of OpenOffice called Sogwang Office.

The operating system was leaked by Zammis Clark ("SlipStream").

Version 4.0 
Very little information is available on version 4.0.

As of late 2017 it is known that a Red Star 4.0 exists and is being field tested.

According to The Pyongyang Times, an official version of Red Star OS 4.0 has been developed as of January 2019, with full network support as well as system and service management tools.

In June and July 2020, South Korea's NKEconomy (NK경제) obtained Red Star 4.0 and published articles about it.

Vulnerabilities 
In 2016, the computer security company Hacker House found a security vulnerability in the integrated web browser Naenara. This vulnerability makes it possible to execute commands on the computer if the user clicks on a crafted link.

References

External links

 
"Download"
 
 
 redstar-tools: A tool used for analyzing the system.

Information technology in North Korea
KDE
Korean-language computing
Linux distributions
State-sponsored Linux distributions